Simo Syrjävaara (born 14 June 1943) is a Finnish retired football player and manager.

Syrjävaara played 182 matches in the Finnish premier division Mestaruussarja for Åbo IFK, Upon Pallo, Reipas and FC Kuusysi. He capped 25 times for Finland national team.

After his player career Syrjävaara worked as an assistant coach for Finland national team and a head coach for Finland women's team and Finland national futsal team.

Honors

Club
Finnish Cup: 1965

Individual
Finnish Football Manager of the Year: 1981

References 

Living people
1943 births
People from Rauma, Finland
Finnish footballers
Association football midfielders
Finland international footballers
Rauman Pallo footballers
Åbo IFK players
FC Kuusysi players
Reipas Lahti players
Finnish football managers
Finland women's national football team managers
Futsal coaches
Sportspeople from Satakunta